Comedy tv was a South Korean cable channel owned by iHQ.It started in October 2000. It ceased to exist as a cable channel from July 5, 2021 as it changed its name to iHQ to allow airing of more diverse programming, and was reborn as a youtube streaming channel.

program allocations
The channel aired contents related with comedy.In 2008, they made a program regarding supernatural phenomena called "ghost spot". In 2009, a program regarding Ulzzang first aired. From 2015, show called "Delicious things(맛있는 녀석들) gained popularity and made the youtube channel owned by the company earn a gold button on youtube.

References

Broadcasting companies of South Korea